The Dacia 500 Lăstun was a small city car manufactured by Tehnometal, Timișoara, under the auto marque Dacia. The name derives from the Romanian for house martin, a small bird related to swallows.

History

A stretched bodywork prototype 500 Lăstun was exhibited at the 1989 Bucharest trade fair. Another prototype from the early 1990s featured hubcaps, body-coloured bumpers, and head restraints.

The Lăstun was marketed with the advertising slogan was "Un Autoturism de Actualitate" (A Contemporary Vehicle).

Production continued until 1992. Due to its size, the Lăstun was primarily a city car, suitable for use as a second car. In 1989 cars received side lights, and in 1991 the Lăstun was lightly restyled to the front, the only modification being a new bonnet with a one-piece grille.  Also the small 0.5L engine had some carburateur break-downs, which brought the average petrol consumption to almost , making the car less economical than the long running Dacia 1300 series.

Tehnometal manufactured a total of 6,532 vehicles.

Engines

References

External links
 Dacia 500 Lăstun at autoevolution.com
 Dacia 500 at automobileromanesti.ro

Timișoara
Lastun
Cars of Romania
Front-wheel-drive vehicles
City cars
Hatchbacks
1990s cars
Cars introduced in 1986
Cars powered by 2-cylinder engines
Cars discontinued in 1991